Ancylolomia uniformella, the Plain grass-moth is a moth in the family Crambidae. It was described by George Hampson in 1896. It is found in India. It is easily distinguished from other Ancylolomia species by its lack of silver stripes on the forewing.

References

Ancylolomia
Moths described in 1896
Moths of Asia